Bromby is a surname. Notable people with the surname include:

 Charles Bromby (1814–1907), Anglican bishop of Tasmania
 Charles Hamilton Bromby (1843–1904), Attorney-General of Tasmania, son of the bishop
 Henry Bromby (1840–1911), Dean of Hobart, son of the bishop
 John Edward Bromby (1809–1889), Australian schoolmaster, brother of the bishop
 Leigh Bromby (born 1980), English footballer
 Peter Bromby (born 1964), Bermudian sailor
REDIRECT Volkmar Bromby (born 1952)Rursee sailor

See also
 Brøndby Municipality